Percy George Bullock (28 August 1893 – 1 December 1986) was an English cricketer who played three first-class matches for Worcestershire in 1921. He was not successful, scoring 2, 0, 9, 0 and 0 in his five innings for the county. He never bowled at first-class level.

Bullock was born in Balsall Heath, which at the time of his birth was in Worcestershire. He died aged 93 in Wythall, also in Worcestershire; he was at the time of his death the oldest surviving cricketer for the county.

References

External links
 
 Statistical summary from CricketArchive

1893 births
1986 deaths
English cricketers
Worcestershire cricketers